Ojo Caliente is an unincorporated community in Taos County, New Mexico, United States.

Description
It is known for its Ojo Caliente Hot Springs.
Ojo Caliente is one of the oldest health resorts in North America. Tewa tradition holds that its pools provided access to the underworld. Frank Mauro purchased the springs in 1932, and it remained a family business for three generations. The resort's buildings are on the National Register of Historic Places. The nearby Ojo Caliente Hot Springs Round Barn, built in 1924, is also listed on the National Register.

References

Unincorporated communities in Taos County, New Mexico
Unincorporated communities in New Mexico